1 Night in Paris is a 2004 pornographic video directed by Rick Salomon. Promoted by Kevin Blatt, it depicts Paris Hilton having sexual intercourse in May 2001 with Salomon. Not originally intended for release, it was filmed primarily with a single, stationary, tripod-mounted camera using "night vision". However, a handful of scenes were filmed indoors without night vision.

Release
The video was released by Salomon shortly after Hilton's TV series The Simple Life debuted, causing a media sensation. When Hilton stated publicly that she had been "out of it", did not know what she was doing during the taping of the video and did not approve its public release, Salomon sued Hilton for defamation. Hilton then countersued Salomon over the release of the tape, settling out of court in July 2005. According to reports, Hilton was awarded as much as $400,000 and planned to donate a percentage to charity.

In a 2006 interview with the British edition of GQ magazine, Hilton stated: "I never received a dime from the video. It's just dirty money and (Salomon) should give it all to some charity for the sexually abused or something. To be honest, I don't even think about it any more."

The video received the AVN Awards in 2005 for "Best Selling Title of the Year", "Best Renting Title of the Year" and "Best Overall Marketing Campaign – Individual Project". The DVD titled 1 Night in Paris is distributed by Red Light District, a production company that produces and distributes pornographic videos. The rights to the video has since been purchased by Vivid Entertainment.

The official release of the video opened with a dedication that states: "In memory of 9/11/01... We will never forget."

American singer-songwriter P!nk parodied one of the scenes from the sex tape in her music video for her song "Stupid Girls".

In 2021 interview with Vanity Fair, Hilton said the tape, which was released without her consent and caused a media sensation, was "humiliating" and is "something that will hurt me for the rest of my life."

"It's always there in the back of my mind. When it happened, people were so mean about it to me. The way that I was spoken about on nightly talk shows and the media, to see things with my family was just heartbreaking. I would be in tears every single day, I didn't want to leave my house, I felt like my life was over," she said.

Accolades
 2005 AVN Award - Best Overall Marketing Campaign, Individual Project
 2005 AVN Award - Best Renting Title of the Year
 2005 AVN Award - Best Selling Title of the Year
 2008 F.A.M.E. Award - Favorite Celebrity Sex Tape

See also

Celebrity sex tape
Sex scandal

References

Further reading
Thomas Fahy: One Night in Paris (Hilton): Wealth, Celebrity, and the Politics of Humiliation, In: Ann C. Hall and Mardia J. Bishop (Ed.): Pop-Porn. Pornography in American Culture, Praeger 2007, p. 75-98

External links

1 Night in Paris at the DVD Edition

2004 films
2000s pornographic films
Sex scandals in the United States
Paris Hilton